Ordinance may refer to:

Law
 Ordinance (Belgium), a law adopted by the Brussels Parliament or the Common Community Commission
 Ordinance (India), a temporary law promulgated by the President of India on recommendation of the Union Cabinet
 Ordinance (university), a particular class of internal legislation in a United Kingdom university
 In England during the Civil War, a law passed by parliament without royal assent; see List of Ordinances and Acts of the Parliament of England, 1642–1660
 Self-denying Ordinance, passed by the Long Parliament of England on 3 April 1645
 Legislation made by the Legislative Council of Hong Kong; see also Law of Hong Kong
 A royal decree, law promulgated on the monarch's own authority
 Delegated legislation for the Australian territories of the Australian Capital Territory and the Northern Territory, passed by the Federal Executive Council (these were mostly converted to acts after the territories gained self-government)
 By-law, a rule established by an organization to regulate itself
 Local ordinance, a law made by a municipality or other local authority
 Northwest Ordinance, July 13, 1787, an act of the Congress of the Confederation of the United States that created the Northwest Territory
 Ordinance XX, a law passed down in Pakistan which prevents Ahmadi Muslims from being identified as Muslims
 Ordinances of 1311, a series of regulations imposed upon King Edward II of England
 Ordonnance in French government, a regulation adopted by the executive in a domain normally reserved for statute law

Religion
 Ordinance (Christianity), Protestant term for religious ritual
Ordinance (Latter Day Saints), a religious ritual enacted using priesthood authority
Baptist ordinance, Believer's Baptism and Lord's Supper
 Ecclesiastical ordinances, the bylaws of a Christian religious organization
Ordinance room, place for Latter-day Saint ordinances
 Ordination, the process by which one is consecrated

See also
 Land Ordinance (disambiguation)
 Land Reform Ordinance (disambiguation)
 List of Acts and Ordinances of the Parliament of England, 1642 to 1660
, a British coaster